Qaleh Zanjir may refer to:
Qaleh Zanjir-e Olya
Qaleh Zanjir-e Sofla